Yuri Vasilyevich Gulyayev — (born 18 September 1935 in Tomilino, Moscow Oblast) is a Soviet and Russian physicist and inventor, Full Member and Member of the Presidium of Russian Academy of Sciences (1992), head of the Semiconductor Electronics chair in the Moscow Institute of Physics and Technology (1971). Yuri Gulyayev works in the field of solid-state physics, radiophysics, electronics, computer science and medical electronics. Gulyayev is a pioneer in the fields of modern physics: acousto-electronics, acousto-optics, spin wave electronics.

In 1995, the International Astronomical Union named the asteroid 1976 YB2 as 6942 Yurigulyaev.

Honours and awards
 Order "For Merit to the Fatherland", 3rd and 4th class
 USSR State Prize, twice (1974, 1984)
 EPS Europhysics Prize (1979)
 Order of the Red Banner of Labour (1985)
 Order of Honour (2006)
 State Prize of the Russian Federation (2006)

References

1935 births
20th-century Russian physicists
Living people
Communist Party of the Soviet Union members
Foreign members of the Chinese Academy of Engineering
Full Members of the Russian Academy of Sciences
Full Members of the USSR Academy of Sciences
Moscow Institute of Physics and Technology alumni
Academic staff of the Moscow Institute of Physics and Technology
People from Lyuberetsky District
Recipients of the Order "For Merit to the Fatherland", 3rd class
Recipients of the Order "For Merit to the Fatherland", 4th class
Recipients of the Order of Honour (Russia)
Recipients of the Order of the Red Banner of Labour
Recipients of the USSR State Prize
State Prize of the Russian Federation laureates

Soviet inventors
Soviet physicists